St Thomas School is an English-medium Catholic school located in Palakkad, Kerala, India. It was established in 1961 and continues to be operated by sisters of Marian Province of the Congregation of the Holy Family, founded by Blessed Mother Mariam Thresia.

The school is situated six km away from Palakkad. The building that houses the classrooms covers an approximate area of five acres with no discrimination over space allocation between boys and girls. The school has a primary school building, high school building and higher secondary building. The campus playing fields are the middle field for games and sports, and the top field for recreation, breaks and picnics. The school has a basketball court.

There is an open-air auditorium in which the house shows, debates, quizzes and cultural performances are staged. Extracurricular subjects such as art and sculpture are taught in workshops. There is also a large playground and garden situated on the school campus. There is large statue of Saint Thomas along with a Christian Church in the school campus. The school publishes an annual school magazine, titled Tharangam.

History
Railway employees in Palakkad desired an English-medium school for their children, and with the blessing of Mar George Alapatt, Bishop of Thrissur, two Holy Family sisters came to Olavakkode and established a nursery school in 1961. Government approval came in 1963 for a lower primary school, then a high school, and the first batch of SSLC students passed out in 1974. The school celebrated its golden jubilee in 2012.

References

External links
St. Thomas Convent Higher Secondary School, Olavakkod, Palakkad

Christian schools in Kerala
Schools in Palakkad
Educational institutions established in 1961
1961 establishments in Kerala
Archdiocese of Thrissur